The Native Military Corps (NMC) was a South African military unit during World War II. It consisted of Black South African volunteers recruited into the Union Defence Force (UDF). Despite the unit's name, they had no combative role and served as labourers attached to white South African UDF military units. The objective was to free up the limited number of white recruits in the UDF for combat roles.

Background 
On 12 July 1940 the UDF created the Directorate of Non-European Army Services (NEAS) to recruit non-white South Africans into the military. The NEAS would consist of three units, Cape Corps, the Indian & Malay Corps and the Native Labour Corps, prior to its name change in August 1940 to the Native Military Corps.

The NEAS was under the command of a director and deputy director who would be responsible for their soldiers when in the Middle East. The first commander was Lt. Colonel B.W. Martin, previously a Director of Native Labour on the Witwatersrand, but he was shifted to the role of deputy director of NEAS troops in the Middle East in November 1940 when Colonel Ernest Thomas Stubbs became director, appointed by General Jan Smuts. Stubbs' previous military role was as a recruiter with the South African Native Labour Corps during World War I. This would cause conflict between the two and poor cooperation between the NEAS in South Africa and the NEAS command in the Middle East with the black troops caught in the middle.

Recruitment

Opposition to recruitment 
General Jan Smuts had narrowly succeeded in parliament in having South Africa join Britain and France in the war with Germany. A considerable number of white Afrikaners opposed supporting Britain in its war with many having pro-German sympathies. To supplement the shortage of white soldiers, Jan Smuts and Major WHE Poole, Deputy Chief of the General Staff believed non-white recruitment was required. Sir Pierre van Ryneveld, Chief of the General Staff opposed the suggestion. White South Africans were also not sympathetic to the idea of black soldiers serving with equal authority with white soldiers and their close contact with the latter as well being exposed to overseas societies and their politics. Black soldiers would serve in non-combatant roles as the 1912 Act that created the UDF dictated no combat roles for any who serve the organisation. Like during World War I, mines, industry and farmers were opposed to the recruitment of black soldiers fearing the loss of cheap labour.

The African National Congress (ANC) and other black organisations supported the war and initially the role of blacks soldiers on condition that they were armed and that there were political rewards for the black population thereafter. There was opposition by blacks to the use of labour battalions. Prior to its final name it was called the Native Military Guards precisely for that reason, though these guards would only carry traditional weapons.

Recruiting 
In early 1940, the NEAS had set recruitment levels at 8,000 black troops, but by 1941, requirements had changed drastically and the NEAS were looking at levels of 60,000 men. Recruitment came to an end in 1943 as the Allies gained the upper hand over the Axis forces in North Africa and the need for these types of troops reduced. Figures differ over the final levels with 77,239 as a UDF estimate to others as high 80,479 which may include recruits that were rejected. Figures show the highest recruitment came from the Transvaal, 52,037, mostly because of a drought in the Northern Transvaal, 9,555 from the Cape Province, 7,366 from Natal, 4,522 from the Orange Free State and 7,000 from South-West Africa. Thirty percent of recruits came from urban South Africa with the other seventy percent coming from the rural areas.

Initial recruitment was through posters and film. Recruitment posters were often mounted in public places frequented by black men. Propaganda recruitment films showing recruits in training were used too, making use of mobile film vans that showed films in black regions of the country. Attempts were made to use Native Commissioners to recruit black men but they were more a hindrance to the process as most black people mistrusted them to begin with. An attempt was made to private companies to promote recruitment to their own black staff but this was frowned upon by the white owners.

Another method was to approach the Black chiefs in rural areas and with monetary incentives get them to command some of their men to sign recruitment papers. This method was open to abuse by the chiefs in the choice of who went as well as fraudulent practices of accepting state money followed by the failure to provide recruits.

There were also issues concerning the perceptions about the war and expectations of what their roles would be in Military Native Corps. Most rural black people had little understanding of what the war in Europe was about and there was an expectation by some potential recruits that their training would involve the learning of new trade excluded by racial labour employment laws within the country.

Poor pay rates also hampered recruitment. As within civilian life, pay rates were based on race with black people on the lowest end of the scale with basic pay in the corps set at 1s 6p a day for unmarried troops and those with dependents, 2s 3p as opposed to basic white troops who were paid 5s a day. The highest rank that black troop could achieve was a sergeant. The other obstacle was the refusal of lower white ranks to take orders from a black soldier of higher rank. This would could only be overcome if a white officer gave the black soldier permission.

Roles in the unit 
 The recruits' role was envisioned to initially be guards and labourers. They would guard military installations, vital infrastructure and prisoners of war. The latter did not go down well within the white population and they would in future be guarded by white soldiers only. By 1941, due to shortages of UDF manpower, black soldiers' roles were increased to transport drivers, dispatch riders, medic and office roles at home and abroad.

Prisoners of war 
During the war, 1,753 Native Military Corps soldiers were captured by German and Italian forces and most taken prisoner at Tobruk. The Germans were said to have treated the black soldiers better than the Italians though most continued performing menial and dangerous tasks in the war zone as POWs for those forces. Some would be later be repatriated from Africa to France, Italy and Germany. The prisoners would receive the same Geneva Convention rights as other prisoners including Red Cross visits, food parcels and letters from home.

Decorations 
Unlike black troops during World War I, black troops of the Native Military Corps were awarded medals for service during conflict in World War II. 119 medals or commendations were awarded to the troops with one Distinguished Conduct Medal awarded for exceptional acts of bravery, sixteen Military Medals (MM) for bravery in battle and two British Empire Medals for meritorious military service. One King's Medal for Bravery, 21 Mentions in Dispatches, 6 Gazetted Commendations, 3 Commendation Cards and 69 Certificates of Good Service were also awarded.

Distinguished Conduct Medal
Corporal Lucas Majozi was awarded a DCM for evacuating wounded soldiers from the battlefield under fire and wounded himself. His medal, one below the Victoria Cross is now in possession of the South African National Museum of Military History in Johannesburg.

Military Medal
The Military Medal was instituted in 1916 and was awarded to warrant officers, non-commissioned officers and privates for bravery in the field.  Recipients are entitled to use the letters MM behind their name.  The following Native Military Corps (NMC), Coloured Corps (CC) and Indian and Malay Corps (IMC) South Africans were awarded the Military Medal:

British Empire Medal
The British Empire Medal was instituted in 1917 and was awarded to warrant officers, non-commissioned officers and privates for meritorious and gallant service.  Recipients are entitled to use the letters BEM behind their name.  The following Native Military Corps (NMC), Coloured Corps (CC) Indian Military Corps (IMC) and Naval Forces (SANF) South Africans were awarded the British Empire Medal:

Casualties 
Figures from the war indicate that the Native Military Corps suffered 770 men wounded and 1,519 dead or presumed dead. The Commonwealth War Graves Commission records 1,677 men of the Native Military Corps buried around the world. The majority of graves are commemorated in South Africa but graves are also found in Egypt, Libya, Italy, France, Germany, Myanmar, Lesotho, Kenya and Namibia.

Other veterans 
Other well known black South Africans who were members of the Native Military Corps include:

 Potlako Leballo
 Henry Nxumalo
 Herman Andimba Toivo ya Toivo

References 

Regiments of South Africa in World War II
Military units and formations established in 1940
Military units and formations of the British Empire in World War II
Military units and formations disestablished in 1947
Non-combatant military personnel